Lawrence G. Paull (April 13, 1938 – November 10, 2019) was an American neofuturistic production designer and art director. He was nominated for an Academy Award in the category Best Art Direction for the film Blade Runner.

Selected filmography
 
 The Hired Hand (1971)
 Star Spangled Girl (1971)
 The Naked Ape (1973)
 Blue Collar (1978)
 In God We Tru$t (1980)
 Blade Runner (1982)
 Romancing the Stone (1984)
 American Flyers (1985)
 Back to the Future (1985)
 Project X (1987)
 Cross My Heart (1987)
 License to Drive (1988)
 Cocoon: The Return (1988)
 Harlem Nights (1989)
 The Last of the Finest (1990)
 Predator 2 (1990)
 City Slickers (1991)
 Unlawful Entry (1992)
 Born Yesterday (1993)
 Naked Gun : The Final Insult (1994)
 Escape from L.A. (1996)

References

External links

1938 births
2019 deaths
American production designers
American art directors
Best Production Design BAFTA Award winners